The Australian Mixed Curling Championship is the national curling championship for mixed curling in Australia. The winners of the tournament will represent Australia at the World Mixed Curling Championship. Event organizer is Australian Curling Federation.

In mixed curling, the positions on a team must alternate between men and women. If a man throws last rocks, which is usually the case, the women must throw lead rocks and third rocks, while the other male member of the team throws second rocks.

History
The tournament was started in 2015. The first championship had only two teams and was won by Ian Palangio's team with a record of 3–0 in best of five series.

The event typically held in June in conjunction with some other Australian Curling Championships.

Champions and medalists 
The past champions and medalists of the event are listed as follows:

(skips marked bold)

See also

 Australian Men's Curling Championship
 Australian Women's Curling Championship

 Australian Mixed Doubles Curling Championship
 Australian Junior Curling Championships
 Australian Senior Curling Championships
 Australian Wheelchair Curling Championship

References

 
Recurring sporting events established in 2015
2015 establishments in Australia
Curling competitions in Australia
Australia